Group 5 was one of six groups of national teams competing in the group stage of the 1982 FIFA World Cup. Play began on 16 June and ended on 25 June 1982. The group consisted of four teams: Seeded team and host nation Spain, World Cup debutants Honduras, Yugoslavia and Northern Ireland.

Northern Ireland won the group after defeating Spain, who also advanced to the second round, in the final group game

Standings

Matches

Spain vs Honduras

Yugoslavia vs Northern Ireland

Spain vs Yugoslavia

Honduras vs Northern Ireland

Honduras vs Yugoslavia

Spain vs Northern Ireland

References

External links
 1982 FIFA World Cup archive
 Spain 1982 FIFA Technical Report: Statistical Details of the Matches pp. 124-128

1982 FIFA World Cup
Spain at the 1982 FIFA World Cup
Northern Ireland at the 1982 FIFA World Cup
Honduras at the 1982 FIFA World Cup
Yugoslavia at the 1982 FIFA World Cup
World Cup